This is a list of Norwegian weapons of World War II. This list will consist of weapons employed by the Norwegian army during the Norwegian campaign or the invasion of Norway by Nazi Germany during World War II.  Norwegian resistance weapons have been put in a separate category to avoid confusion with those used by the Norwegian army during the Norwegian campaign.

Small arms

Sidearms 
 Colt Kongsberg M1914 Norwegian licensed production of the American Colt M1911
 Walther P38 Norwegian resistance

Rifles 

 Krag–Jørgensen M1894
 Krag-Petersson reserves
 Kammerlader M1860/67 reserves 
 Jarmann M1884 reserves
 Remington M1867 reserves
 Mauser Karabiner 98k Norwegian resistance
Lee-Enfield Norwegian resistance

 M1 Carbine Norwegian resistance
 M1917 Enfield Norwegian resistance
 M1 Garand Norwegian resistance

Submachine guns 

 Sten Mk 2  Norwegian resistance
 Suomi KP/-31  used by volunteers in Finland
 MP 38 and MP 40 Norwegian resistance

Machine guns 

 Madsen M14 and M29
 Colt M/29 Norwegian licensed production of the American Browning M1917
 Hotchkiss M1914
 Browning M1918A2 Norwegian resistance
 KG m/40 
 MG 13
 Eriksen M/25
 MG 34 Norwegian resistance
 Bren Mk II Norwegian resistance

Artillery

Field artillery 

 Ehrhardt 7.5 cm Model 1901

Heavy Artillery 

 Rheinmetall 12 cm leFH 08
 12 cm felthaubits/m32

Mountain artillery 

 7.5 cm Gebirgskanone Model 1911
 M.27 (mountain gun)

Anti-Aircraft weapons 

 7.5 cm L/45 M/16 anti aircraft gun
 7.5 cm L/45 M/32 anti aircraft gun

Armoured fighting vehicles 

 Rikstanken(Landsverk L-120 only 1)
 Panserbil M-23 Armored Cars (3)

Norwegian resistance small arms

Rifles 

 SMLE

SMG 

 Sten MK2 And MK5

References 

Norway
Weapons of Norway